Innerpeffray railway station served the hamlets of Innerpeffray and Millhills in the Scottish county of Perth and Kinross.

History 
Opened on 21 May 1866 by the Crieff and Methven Junction Railway, then by the Caledonian Railway, it became part of the London, Midland and Scottish Railway during the Grouping of 1923. The station closed briefly on 1 January 1917, before reopening again on 1 June 1919. Passing on to the Scottish Region of British Railways on nationalisation in 1948, it was finally closed to passenger and goods traffic by British Railways on 1 October 1951.

References

Notes

Sources 
 
 
 
 Innerpeffray  station on navigable O. S. map
 List of closed railway stations in Britain

Disused railway stations in Perth and Kinross
Railway stations in Great Britain opened in 1866
Railway stations in Great Britain closed in 1951
1866 establishments in Scotland
Former Caledonian Railway stations